Just One More is the fourth full-length release from the Mad Caddies. This album mixes much ska, punk, reggae, and even a little polka as well. The subject matter throughout this CD in comparison to their others is significantly more serious.

Track listing

All songs written by Mad Caddies

Personnel

Mad Caddies
Chuck Robertson – vocals
Sascha Lazor – guitar, banjo
Mark Iversen – bass
Keith Douglas – trumpet, background vocals
Ed Hernandez – trombone
Brian Flenniken – drums
Guest musicians
Spike Slawson – additional vocals
Lynda Mandolyn – additional vocals
Logan Livermore – additional vocals
Leon Zegetinbigger – additional guitar
Austin Beleone – organ

Production
Eddie Schreyer – mastering (all tracks)

For tracks 4, 6–10, 13 & 15
Angus Cooke – engineer, producer
Mark Casselman – engineer, producer
Mad Caddies – producers

For tracks 1–3, 5, 11, 12 & 14
Mad Caddies – producers
Ryan Greene – producer, engineer
Adam Krammer – additional engineering

References

Mad Caddies albums
2003 albums
Fat Wreck Chords albums